Silent Running is an album by 65daysofstatic. It is an alternate soundtrack to the 1972 science fiction film, Silent Running. It was originally commissioned by Glasgow Film Festival at the beginning of 2011 as a live re-score performed by the band. In July 2011, the band announced their intention to fund a studio recording of the Silent Running soundtrack by raising $7500 through the crowd-funding website Indiegogo. By the end of the funding period they had raised over $27,000. Silent Running was released in mid-November 2011 as a numbered, limited edition vinyl LP to those Indiegogo funders who had paid for this option, and as a digital download from the band's website.

Track listing

References

2011 albums
65daysofstatic albums
Indiegogo projects
Alternative versions of soundtracks
Crowdfunded albums